Liis Klaar (née Liis Kõll; born 25 January 1938 in Tallinn) is an Estonian sociologist and politician. She was a member of IX Riigikogu.

References

Living people
1938 births
Estonian sociologists
Estonian women sociologists
Social Democratic Party (Estonia) politicians
Isamaa politicians
Members of the Riigikogu, 1999–2003
Women members of the Riigikogu
Estonian World War II refugees
Estonian emigrants to Sweden
Stockholm University alumni
Politicians from Tallinn
21st-century Estonian women politicians